The dean of St Paul's is a member of, and chair of the Chapter of St Paul's Cathedral in London in the Church of England. The dean of St Paul's is also ex officio dean of the Order of the British Empire.

The current dean is Andrew Tremlett, who was installed on 25 September 2022.

List of deans

High Medieval
1090–1107 Wulman
1107–1111 Ranulf Flambard (disputed)
1111–1138 William de Mareni
1138–1157 Ralph de Langford
1158–1180 Hugh de Mareni
1180–1199 Ralph de Diceto
1200–1216 Alard de Burnham
1216–1218 Gervase de Howbridge
1218–1227 Robert de Watford
1228–1231 Martin de Pattishall
1231–1241 Geoffrey de Lucy
1241–1243 William of Sainte-Mère-Eglise
1243–1253 Henry de Cornhill
1253–1257 Walter de Saleron
1257–1260 Robert de Barton
1260–1261 Peter de Newport
January 1262–July 1262 Richard Talbot
July 1262 – 1263 John de Ebulo
1263–1267 Geoffrey de Fering
1268–1273 John Chishull
1273–1276 Hervey de Boreham
1276–1283 Thomas Ingoldsthorpe
1283–1285 Roger de La Legh
1285–1294 William de Montfort
1294–1306 Ralph Baldock

Late Medieval
1306–1313 Arnald Frangerius de Cantilupo
1314–1316 John Sandale
1316–1317 Richard Newport
1317 Roger de Northburgh
1317–1322 Vitalis de Testa
1322–1335 John de Everdon
1335–1354 Gilbert de Bruera
1354–1361 Richard de Kilvington
1361–1362 Walter de Alderbury
1362–1364 Thomas Trilleck
1364–1389 John de Appleby
1389–1400 Thomas de Eure
1400–1405 Thomas Stowe
1406–1421 Thomas More
1422–1441 Reginald Kentwood
1441–1456 Thomas Lisieux
1456–1457 Laurence Booth
1457–1468 William Say
1468–1471 Roger Radclyffe
1471–1478 Thomas Wynterbourne
1479–1499 William Worsley

Early modern
1499–1505 Robert Sherborne
1505–1519 John Colet
1519–1536 Richard Pace
1536–1540 Richard Sampson
1540–1545 John Incent
1545–1554 William May
1554–1556 John Feckenham
1556–1559 Henry Cole
1559–1560 William May (again)

Post-Reformation

See also
Dean and Chapter of St Paul's

Notes
  Died in office

References
Deans of St Paul's. Greenway, D. E. (1968). Fasti Ecclesiae Anglicanae 1066–1300. Volume 1: St. Paul's, London. British History Online. pp. 4–8.
Deans of St Paul's. Horn, J. M. (1963). Fasti Ecclesiae Anglicanae 1300–1541. Volume 5: St Paul's, London. British History Online. pp. 4–7.
Deans of St Paul's. Horn, J. M. (1969). Fasti Ecclesiae Anglicanae 1541–1857. Volume 1: St. Paul's, London. British History Online. pp. 5–7.
WR Matthews:   Date accessed: 15 February 2006.
St Paul's Cathedral press release 23 Jan 2006:  Date accessed: 15 February 2006.

 
Dean of St Paul's
1090 establishments in England